Jordan is an Arab kingdom in Western Asia, on the East Bank of the Jordan River.  Jordan is classified as a country of "high human development" with an "upper middle income" economy. The Jordanian economy, one of the smallest economies in the region, is attractive to foreign investors based upon a skilled workforce. The country is a major tourist destination, and also attracts medical tourism due to its well developed health sector. Nonetheless, a lack of natural resources, large flow of refugees and regional turmoil have crippled economic growth.

Notable firms 
This list includes notable companies with primary headquarters located in the country. The industry and sector follow the Industry Classification Benchmark taxonomy. Organizations which have ceased operations are included and noted as defunct.

References 

 
Jordan